The BAlanced Tree Overlay Network (BATON) is a distributed tree structure for peer-to-peer (P2P) systems. Different from other overlays that use a distributed hash table (DHT), such as in the Chord system, BATON organizes peers in a distributed tree to support range search. In addition, BATON tries to keep the tree height-balanced, similar to the AVL tree.

System model

BATON is a binary tree. In each tree level, the node is named by its position in the tree.

Each node in BATON keeps four kinds of links:
 a link to its parent node (unless it is root)
 links up to two-children nodes
 a link to left and right adjacent node
 links to select neighbor nodes maintained in a left routing table (LRT) and right routing table (RRT). Combining these, the routing table is created 
The level of any node is one greater than the level of its parent. Root is on level 0. For a node at position , it will fill its left routing table by nodes at position  for any valid  and fill its right routing table by nodes at position  for any valid . The construction of the routing table has slight resemblance to the finger tables in Chord.

So according to the example structure, node 2:1 would keep links to 

 1:0 (parent)
 3:2 (children)
 0:0 and 3:2 (adjacent)
 2:0, 2:2 and 2:3 (neighbors)

Height-Balanced

BATON is balanced if and only if at any node in the tree, the height of its two sub-trees differ by at most one. If any node detects that the tree validates the height-balanced constraint, a restructuring is initiated.

Node joining and leaving
The new node's joining request will always be forwarded to the leaf node. The leaf node will check to see whether the routing table is full. If the routing table is full, this level is full of nodes and the leaf node can accept the new node as its child to create a new level node. Otherwise, it must forward the new node to take over one of the empty positions.

When a node wants to leave the network, it must update the routing tables of its parent node, child nodes, adjacent nodes and routing nodes. If this node is a leaf node, it can leave the network safely. Otherwise, it must find a leaf node to replace its position.

Routing
In BATON, each node maintains a continuous key space. Once a new node joins as its child, it splits its space and assigns half of it to the child. In this partition way, if we travel the tree in in-order, we can search the whole space in ascendant order. That's why BATON supports range queries.

For a range query q, BATON first locates its left bound, q.low. And then the search process will travel the tree in in-order (by adjacent link), until reach the upper bound, q.up. For locating a single key, BATON performs the similar routing strategy as Chord. First, the request is routed to the farthest routing nodes which does not over hit the key. If no such routing nodes exist, the parent link, child link or adjacent link is used.

Restructure
When a node x accepts a joining node y as its child and detects that the tree balance is violated, it initiates the restructuring process. Without loss of generality, suppose that this restructuring is towards the right. Assume that y joins as x's left child. To rebalance the
system, x notifies y to replace its position, and notifies its right adjacent node z that x will replace z's position. z then checks its right adjacent node t to see if its left child is empty. If it is, and adding a child to t does not affect the tree balance, z takes the position of t's left child as its new position and the restructuring process stops. If t's left child is full or t cannot accept x as its left child without violating the balance property, z occupies t's position while t needs to find a new position for itself by continuing to its right adjacent node.

Load balancing
BATON adopts two kinds of load balancing strategy. Once a node n detects that it is over loaded,
 If its left or right adjacent node is light loaded, the node will transfer some data to the adjacent node to lower its load
 If its adjacent nodes are not capable to share the load, the node will invoke a process to find a randomly light loaded node in the network. The light loaded node leaves its original position and joins as the child of the overloaded node to take over part of its data. The restructure process may be invoked.

BATON extensions
 BATON* - BAlanced m-ary Tree Overlay Network: A height-balanced m-ary search tree extension of BATON with further links for efficiency, fault-tolerance, and load-balancing.
  - null-BAlanced m-ary Tree Overlay Network: A null-balancey m-ary search tree extension of BATON* with up to 50% better performance w.r.t. required routing hops.

See also
 Chord
 CAN
 Pastry

References

Further reading

External links

 Website of BestPeer Project

Distributed data storage